Hermann Karl Rudolf Gebhard von Alvensleben was a Prussian Generalleutnant who participated in the Austro-Prussian War and the Franco-Prussian War. He commanded the 1st Cavalry Division during the Battle of Königgrätz and commanded several Army Corps' during the Franco-Prussian War.

Origin
Hermann comes from the Low German noble family, the House of Alvensleben. He was the son of the Prussian lieutenant general  (1778-1831) and his wife Karoline, née von Hirschfeld (1783-1849).

Military career
After visiting the Kadettenhaus Neubau, he joined the regiment of the Gardes du Corps of the Prussian Army on July 28, 1827 as a flag ensign. In 1866, he led the 1st Cavalry Division in the cavalry corps of the 1st Army as a Major General during the Austro-Prussian War. After the end of the war he was promoted to lieutenant general and commanded the Guards Cavalry Division. During the Franco-Prussian War on July 1870, Alvensleben was the governor general in the I, II, III and X Corps under General Eduard Vogel von Falckenstein. A month later, he was ordered to Bremen to organize the guarding of the coast from Dorum to Emden. Alvensleben was relieved of this position at the end of March 1871 and was placed on the retiree list on April 15, 1871. He returned to Schochwitz and lived there until his death on January 8, 1887.

Legacy
Alvenslebenstrasse in Hanover was named after him.

Family
Alvensleben married Karoline von Kalitzsch (1814–1878) on October 6, 1836 in Dobritz. The marriage produced ten children, including:

Busso (1840–1870), Prussian first lieutenant, killed at La Blanchette ⚭ 1865 Jenny Kukein (1848–1868)
Ludolf (1844–1912), Major General ⚭ Antoinette Freiin von Ricou (1870–1950)
Mechtild (1859–1941) ⚭ 1890 Alkmar II. von Alvensleben (1841–1898), Prussian lieutenant general
Gertrud (1852-1946) ⚭ 1878 Heinrich Bartels (1848-1914), lord of Langendorf
Elsbeth (1856–1945) ⚭ 1886 Alexander von Schwarzenberg-Hohenlandsberg (1842–1918)

References

Bibliography
 Hellmut Kretzschmar: Geschichtliche Nachrichten von dem Geschlecht von Alvensleben seit 1800. Burg 1930, S. 149–150.
 
 Gothaisches Genealogisches Taschenbuch der Adeligen Häuser. Justus Perthes, Gotha 1902, Dritter Jahrgang S. 28.

1809 births
1887 deaths
Prussian people of the Austro-Prussian War
German military personnel of the Franco-Prussian War
People from the Province of Saxony
Lieutenant generals of Prussia
People from Saalekreis
Hermann
Military personnel from Saxony-Anhalt